Brekkeåsen is a residential area in Re municipality in Vestfold county, Norway. Together with Kirkevoll, Brekkeåsen constitutes a village which encircles Våle church. The village has 1,048 inhabitants as of 1 January 2005, encompassing an area of 0.95 km².

Villages in Vestfold og Telemark